Alby-sur-Chéran (literally Alby on Chéran) is a commune in the Haute-Savoie department in the Auvergne-Rhône-Alpes region in south-eastern France.

Geography
The Chéran flows northwestward through the north-eastern part of the commune and crosses the village.

Population

See also
Communes of the Haute-Savoie department

References

Communes of Haute-Savoie